Ion Dezideriu Sîrbu (also known as Ion Desideriu Sârbu; June 28, 1919 – September 17, 1989) was a Romanian philosopher, novelist, essayist and dramatist.

Sîrbu was born in Petrila, Hunedoara.  A university associate professor and theater critic, he was a victim of the communist regime, spending about 6 years (1957-1963) as a political prisoner. He died at Craiova, aged 70.  His main novel, Adio, Europa! ("Adieu, Europe!"), was published posthumously.

Romanian academics
Romanian male novelists
20th-century Romanian philosophers
Romanian theatre critics
People from Petrila
Romanian prisoners and detainees
1919 births
1989 deaths
20th-century Romanian novelists
20th-century Romanian dramatists and playwrights
Male dramatists and playwrights
20th-century Romanian male writers